¡Ay Carmela!   is a 1990 Spanish comedy-drama film directed by  Carlos Saura and based on the eponymous play by José Sanchís Sinisterra. The film stars Carmen Maura, Andrés Pajares, and Gabino Diego as a trio of travelling players performing for the Republic, who inadvertently find themselves on the nationalist side during the closing months of the Spanish Civil War. The film was selected as the Spanish entry for the Best Foreign Language Film at the 63rd Academy Awards, but was not accepted as a nominee.

Plot
Carmela, Paulino, and Gustavete - who is mute as the result of an explosion - are a trio of travelling vaudeville performers. Amidst the chaos of the Spanish Civil War, they are in the town of Montejo, entertaining republican troops with their variety show. They are survivors who are motivated, not exactly by patriotism, but by a desire for self-preservation. Their show consists of four acts. It begins with Carmela singing and dancing a traditional song. The audience is enthusiastic during her performance, but the mood changes completely when the sound of approaching nationalist planes is heard.

As the planes fly overhead, Paulino reads a poem by Antonio Machado which introduces a note of patriotic fervour in accordance with republican feeling in 1938. The seriousness of the moment is followed by a comic routine in which Paulino twists himself into a variety of ridiculous postures in an attempt to break wind. The fourth and final act is a 'tableau vivant' in which Carmela represents justice while Paulino brandishes the republican flag and they sing a song of freedom.

The dangers and deprivation that they encounter in the republican side encourage the trio to go to Valencia. To obtain gasoline for the trip Carmela has to distract a republican truck driver while Paulino and Gustavete steal the fuel. They make this difficult journey on a misty night and inadvertently end up in nationalist territory. They are detained by a nationalist officer and are incriminated by the republican flag they carry amongst their props. They are arrested and taken as prisoners to the local school, which serves as a prison camp where the republicans are held. Carmela befriends a fellow prisoner: a Polish soldier member of the International Brigade and is surprised that he has come to fight in Spain, a foreign land whose name he cannot even pronounce. In an atmosphere of mounting tension and terror, some of the prisoners are taken away to be shot. Carmela, Paulino and Gustavete are driven away in an army car. They are convinced that they are also going to be killed, but instead they are taken to the local theatre where they meet an Italian officer, Lieutenant Amelio di Ripamonte. Surprisingly, the lieutenant, learning that they are performers, wants them to take part in a show he has been planning to entertain the nationalist troops. They must stage a burlesque of the Republic in exchange for their freedom.

For the variety show that they are to perform to the nationalists, Paulino rewrites their old script. From the outset, the fiery and patriotic Carmela is defiant and unwilling to go along with it, displaying her true convictions as an anti-fascist.  However, Paulino persuades her that since their lives are at stake she must collaborate in the performance of the now anti-republican numbers.

On the day of the show, both artists are indisposed as Carmela has her period and Paulino has an upset stomach from eating a rabbit which Gustavete, writing on his slate, now confirms to have been a cat. The presence of the Polish prisoners, who have been brought to witness a mockery of their ideals, greatly upsets Carmela, and she initially refuses to perform a number involving the republican flag. Structurally, the show is largely similar to the one they used to perform for the republican troops. Musical numbers are followed by a poem, now read by the lieutenant. The third act involves a comic sketch, "The Republic goes to the Doctor". In this simplistic parody,  Paulino plays a gay republican doctor who is visited by a female patient, the Spanish Republic, played by Carmela. She claims that she has been made pregnant by a Russian lover, played by Gustavete. In a number which gives full scope to all the possible sexual innuendos the audience cares to imagine, Carmela invites the doctor to insert his thermometer in her, to which he refuses, making the excuse that it is broken.
 
Carmela, increasingly irritated by the mockery of the Republic and enervated by the presence of the Polish soldiers, gradually loses heart in her performance, and her frustration at the mockery of the ideals she holds dear seethes to the surface jeopardizing the credibility of the parody. The sketch quickly disintegrates as the Polish soldiers begin to rebel in the galleries and the fascists become infuriated. The scene comes to a climax as Carmela starts singing 'Ay Carmela' and lowers the republican flag to expose her breasts in defiance of the earlier cries of 'Whore!' from the audience. A nationalist officer then emerges from the stalls, raises a pistol and shoots Carmela in the forehead. Gustavete suddenly recovers his voice, calling out in anguish, but Carmela falls to the floor dead.

The next scene shows Paulino and Gustavete visiting Carmela's rudimentary grave which they decorate with flowers and the latter's chalk board, now redundant since Gustavete regained his voice when Carmela was shot. The only words here are spoken by Gustavete – "Come on, Paulino" – as he leads him away. The two men take to the road again and the song "¡Ay Carmela!" rises in the background closing the film as it had begun and taking it into the credits.

Cast
 Carmen Maura as Carmela
 Andrés Pajares as Paulino
 Gabino Diego as Gustavete
 Mauricio De Razza  as Lieutenant Ripamonte
 José Sancho as Captain

Production 
Made in 1990, ¡Ay Carmela!  was director Carlos Saura’s twenty-third, feature-length film and, in his own words, the first in which he was able to treat the subject of the Civil War with any kind of humour: "I would have been incapable a few years ago of treating our war with humour… but now it is different, for sufficient time has passed to adopt a broader perspective, and here there is no doubt that by employing humour it is possible to say things that it would be more difficult, if not impossible, to say in another way".

In Saura's earlier films, allusions to the war and to its consequences were characterized by violence and brutality, and if there was any humour at all it was grim and ironic. Despite the fact that the action in ¡Ay Carmela! is set fully in the War, Saura's treatment of it employs comic effects, including farce.

The film is based on the play of the same name by the Valencian dramatist, José Sanchís Sinisterra.  The play was a success in Spain and was translated to English and staged in London. The play focuses entirely on the two principal characters, Carmela and Paulino, and tells their story largely in flashback.  When it begins, Paulino is alone and depressed, for Carmela is already dead, the victim of a fascist bullet at their last performance as variety artist. In the first part of the play Carmela returns as a ghost to converse with Paulino, blaming him for all that has happened, and in the second part evokes in detail the fatal performance. The play contains only two characters and a single setting. Saura adapted the play with the help of scriptwriter Rafael Azcona who had worked with him many times before but with whom he had broken in 1975 prior to the making of Cria Cuervos.

Saura opened up the story and presented it not in flashback but in a linear manner. This allowed Saura to follow the journey of Carmela and Paulino during the two days in which they travel from Republican to Nationalist territory, performing their act in both camps. It also allowed much more scope for the relationship and the characters of Carmela and Paulino to evolve and in relation to the events in which they find themselves caught up.  It also enable Saura to depict other characters and locations which are mentioned in the play, in particular, Gustavette, the traveling companion of Carmela and Paulino, and the Italian officer and theatre director, Lieutenant Amelio di Ripamonte.  The town where the action occurs and the theatre in which the final third of the film is located are also depicted. Some artistic resonance evoke memories of Ernst Lubitsch's  1942 comedy To Be or Not to Be.

The film takes its title from the song "Ay Carmela", which begins and ends the film. Originally a song from the War of Independence against Napoleon, it had been adapted and became the favourite song of the Republican soldiers and of the International Brigade during the Spanish Civil War.

DVD release
¡Ay Carmela! is available in Region 2 DVD in Spanish with English and French subtitles.

Awards
Winner of the 1990 Goya Awards for:
Best Film
Best Director: Carlos Saura
Best Actor: Andrés Pajares
Best Actress: Carmen Maura
 Best Adapted Screenplay: Carlos Saura, Rafael Azcona
Best Supporting Actor: Gabino Diego
Best Editing: Pablo González del Amo
Best Sound:  Gilles Ortion, Alfonso Pino
Best Costume Design: Rafael Palmero, Mercedes Sánchez
Best Make-Up: José Antonio Sánchez, Paquita Núñez
Best Production Design: Rafael Palmero
Best Production Supervision: Víctor Albarrán
Best Special Effects: Reyes Abades

See also
 List of submissions to the 63rd Academy Awards for Best Foreign Language Film
 List of Spanish submissions for the Academy Award for Best Foreign Language Film

Notes

References 
 Edwards, Gwynne, Indecent Exposures, PMarion Boyars, 1995, 
 Schwartz, Ronald, The Great Spanish Films: 1950 - 1990, Scarecrow Press, London, 1991,

External links 
 
 ¡Ay Carmela! in Encyclopedia of Contemporary Spanish Film. Eds. Alex Pinar and Salvador Jimenez Murguia. Rowman & Littlefield, 2018 
 https://www.youtube.com/watch?v=OFZLwsA-Si8

1990 films
Films set in the 1930s
Spanish comedy-drama films
1990s Spanish-language films
Spanish Civil War films
Films directed by Carlos Saura
Spanish war drama films
Best Film Goya Award winners
Films featuring a Best Actor Goya Award-winning performance
Films shot in Madrid
1990 comedy-drama films
Films with screenplays by Rafael Azcona
1990s Spanish films